HD 45866, also known as HR 2363 is a solitary star located in the northern circumpolar constellation Camelopardalis. It it faintly visible to the naked eye as an orange-hued star with an apparent magnitude of 5.72. At its current distance, HD 45866's brightness is diminished by 0.26 magnitudes due to interstellar dust. It has an absolute magnitude of −0.89

This is an evolved red giant with a stellar classification of K5 III. It has 2.34 times the mass of the Sun but it has expanded to nearly 50 times the radius of the Sun at an age of 1.15 billion years. It has an iron abundance 78% of the Sun's, making it slightly metal deficient.

References

K-type giants
Camelopardalis (constellation)
BD+78 00227
045866
031940
2363